Morula rodgersi is a species of sea snail, a marine gastropod mollusk in the family Muricidae, the murex snails or rock snails.

Description

Distribution
This marine species occurs off Guam..

References

 Houart, R. (2000). Morula rodgersi n.sp., a new Muricidae (Rapaninae) from Guam. Novapex (Jodoigne) 1(3-4): 101–104

External links
 MNHN. Paris: holotype

rodgersi
Gastropods described in 2000